Neobuxbaumia macrocephala is a long-lived columnar cactus

Distribution
It is endemic to the Tehuacán-Cuicatlán Valley in central Mexico. Within this region the species may be found on calcareous soil in xerophytic shrublands and tropical dry forest at an altitude of 1700 m above sea level.

Description
It is a branched columnar cactus that reaches between 7 and 15 m in height. The number of branches in an adult plant may vary from one to 10. Plants bear a reddish cephalium at the tip of each branch from which purple-red flowers emerge between May and June, during the end of the dry season. The species is hermaphroditic and its flowers are mainly nocturnal, opening at sunset (1900 h) and
closing in the morning (1000 h). The bats Choeronycteris mexicana Tschudi, Leptonycteris curasoae Miller, and Leptonycteris nivalis (Saussure) are the main pollinators that promote seed production. Fruits ripen from June to August and are consumed by bats and bird species that probably act as seed dispersers.   
Neobuxbaumia macrocephala occurs at densities between 130 and 200 individuals/ha. Seed germination and seedling establishment occurs mostly beneath the canopies of several species of trees and shrubs, such as Pseudosmodingium multifolium, Lippia graveolens, Gochnatia hypoleuca, and Aeschynomene compacta. First reproduction occurs when plants are around 2 m tall.

Ecology
The microbiota associated to this species include methylotrophic bacteria, see Methylotroph, both in its stem surface and inside the plant. Their function might be related to the growth promotion of N. macrocephala, but it has not been demonstrated yet.

Conservation status
CITES Appendix II - Trade controlled to avoid use incompatible with species survival.

Synonyms
Carnegiea macrocephala (F.A.C. Weber ex K. Schum.) P.V. Heath   Calyx 2(3): 109. 1992. (Calyx)
Cereus macrocephalus (F.A.C. Weber ex K. Schum.) A. Berger  Annual Report of the Missouri Botanical Garden 16: 62. 1905. (Rep. (Annual) Missouri Bot. Gard.)
Cereus melocactus (F.A.C. Weber ex K. Schum.) A. Berger  Annual Report of the Missouri Botanical Garden 16: 62. 1905. (Rep. (Annual) Missouri Bot. Gard.)

References

Bibliography
Godínez-Alvarez, H., and A. Valiente-Banuet. 2004. Demography of the columnar cactus Neobuxbaumia macrocephala: a comparative approach using population projection matrices. Plant Ecology 174: 109-118.

Esparza-Olguín, L., T. Valverde, and E. Vilchis-Anaya. 2002. Demographic analysis of a rare columnar cactus (Neobuxbaumia macrocephala) in the Tehuacán Valley, México. Biological Conservation 103: 349-359.

External links
Info at tropicos.org

macrocephala
Endemic flora of Mexico
Tehuacán Valley matorral